Dut Tawan Dang Phu-pha (lit: Like The Sun, As A Cliff; English title: Moral of the Sun) is Thai TV series or lakorn aired on Thailand's Channel 7 from November 26, 2012, to January 8, 2013, on Mondays and Tuesdays  at 20:25 for 13 episodes.

Plot summary
To investigate the death of his father, Tai a young man who is a zookeeper, have been a supporter in the gang of the godfather Boon, and that makes him meet the truth.

Cast
Siwat Chotchaicharin as Tai
Nattasha Nauljam as Plai Fah
Sammy Cowell as Nannapad or Khun Pad
Sira Rattanapokasatit as Otee
Chuchai Busala-Khamvong as Boon
Suphakit Tangthatswasd as Ah Huad
Poolaphat Attapanyapol as Riao
Kanyapat Tanunchaikan as Paeng
Pichayadon Peungphan as Pete
Nukkid Boonthong as Mungkorn
Kwankawin Thamrongratset as Lily
Jarin Promrungsi as Ah Peaw
Kriangsak Reanchaithong as Na Chat
Yup Khan as Na Pad
Charattha Imraporn as Nu Aem
Wanvisa Srivilai as Betty

Ratings
In the tables below, the  represent the highest ratings and the  represent the lowest ratings.

References

External links
  
Official opening title
Official ending title
Original soundtrack

2012 Thai television series debuts
2013 Thai television series endings
Thai television soap operas
Thai action television series
Channel 7 (Thailand) original programming